Infante Don Luis is a station on Line 3 of the Metro Ligero. It is located in fare Zone B2.

References 

Madrid Metro Ligero stations
Buildings and structures in Boadilla del Monte
Railway stations in Spain opened in 2007